In probability theory, an event is said to happen almost surely (sometimes abbreviated as a.s.) if it happens with probability 1 (or Lebesgue measure 1). In other words, the set of possible exceptions may be non-empty, but it has probability 0. The concept is analogous to the concept of "almost everywhere" in measure theory.

In probability experiments on a finite sample space with a non-zero probability for each outcome, there is no difference between almost surely and surely (since having a probability of 1 entails including all the sample points). However, this distinction becomes important when the sample space is an infinite set, because an infinite set can have non-empty subsets of probability 0.

Some examples of the use of this concept include the strong and uniform versions of the law of large numbers, and the continuity of the paths of Brownian motion.

The terms almost certainly (a.c.) and almost always (a.a.) are also used. Almost never describes the opposite of almost surely: an event that happens with probability zero happens almost never.

Formal definition
Let  be a probability space. An event  happens almost surely if . Equivalently,  happens almost surely if the probability of  not occurring is zero: . More generally, any event  (not necessarily in ) happens almost surely if  is contained in a null set: a subset  in  such that  The notion of almost sureness depends on the probability measure . If it is necessary to emphasize this dependence, it is customary to say that the event  occurs P-almost surely, or almost surely .

Illustrative examples
In general, an event can happen "almost surely", even if the probability space in question includes outcomes which do not belong to the event—as the following examples illustrate.

Throwing a dart
Imagine throwing a dart at a unit square (a square with an area of 1) so that the dart always hits an exact point in the square, in such a way that each point in the square is equally likely to be hit. Since the square has area 1, the probability that the dart will hit any particular subregion of the square is equal to the area of that subregion. For example, the probability that the dart will hit the right half of the square is 0.5, since the right half has area 0.5.

Next, consider the event that the dart hits exactly a point in the diagonals of the unit square. Since the area of the diagonals of the square is 0, the probability that the dart will land exactly on a diagonal is 0. That is, the dart will almost never land on a diagonal (equivalently, it will almost surely not land on a diagonal), even though the set of points on the diagonals is not empty, and a point on a diagonal is no less possible than any other point.

Tossing a coin repeatedly
Consider the case where a (possibly biased) coin is tossed, corresponding to the probability space , where the event  occurs if a head is flipped, and  if a tail is flipped.

Now, suppose an experiment were conducted where the coin is tossed repeatedly, with outcomes  and the assumption that each flip's outcome is independent of all the others (i.e., they are independent and identically distributed; i.i.d). Define the sequence of random variables on the coin toss space,  where . i.e. each  records the outcome of the th flip.

In this case, any infinite sequence of heads and tails is a possible outcome of the experiment. However, any particular infinite sequence of heads and tails has probability 0 of being the exact outcome of the (infinite) experiment. This is because the i.i.d. assumption implies that the probability of flipping all heads over  flips is simply . Letting  yields 0, since  by assumption. The result is the same no matter how much we bias the coin towards heads, so long as we constrain  to be strictly between 0 and 1. In fact, the same result even holds in non-standard analysis—where infinitesimal probabilities are not allowed.

Moreover, the event "the sequence of tosses contains at least one " will also happen almost surely (i.e., with probability 1).
But if instead of an infinite number of flips, flipping stops after some finite time, say 1,000,000 flips, then the probability of getting an all-heads sequence, would no longer be 0, while the probability of getting at least one tails, would no longer be 1 (i.e., the event is no longer almost sure).

Asymptotically almost surely
In asymptotic analysis, a property is said to hold asymptotically almost surely (a.a.s.) if over a sequence of sets, the probability converges to 1. For instance, in number theory, a large number is asymptotically almost surely composite, by the prime number theorem; and in random graph theory, the statement " is connected" (where  denotes the graphs on  vertices with edge probability ) is true a.a.s. when, for some 

   

In number theory, this is referred to as "almost all", as in "almost all numbers are composite". Similarly, in graph theory, this is sometimes referred to as "almost surely".

See also

Almost
Almost everywhere, the corresponding concept in measure theory
Convergence of random variables, for "almost sure convergence"
Cromwell's rule, which says that probabilities should almost never be set as zero or one
Degenerate distribution, for "almost surely constant"
Infinite monkey theorem, a theorem using the aforementioned terms
List of mathematical jargon

Notes

References

Probability theory
Mathematical terminology